The 2012–13 Football League One (referred to as the Npower Football League One for sponsorship reasons) was the ninth season of the league under its current title and twenty-first season under its current league division format. The season began on 18 August 2012 and ended on 27 April 2013.

Changes from last season

Team changes

To League One
Relegated from the Championship
 Portsmouth
 Coventry City
 Doncaster Rovers

Promoted from League Two
 Swindon Town
 Shrewsbury Town
 Crawley Town
 Crewe Alexandra

From League One
Promoted to the Championship
 Charlton Athletic
 Sheffield Wednesday
 Huddersfield Town

Relegated to League Two
 Wycombe Wanderers
 Chesterfield
 Exeter City
 Rochdale

League table

Play-offs

Team overview

Stadia and locations

Personnel and sponsoring
Note: Flags indicate national team as has been defined under FIFA eligibility rules. Players may hold more than one non-FIFA nationality.

 1 According to current revision of List of English Football League managers

Managerial changes

Results

Season statistics

Top scorers

- includes 1 goal for Carlisle United
- includes 11 goals for Scunthorpe United

Assists

Hat-tricks

Scoring
First goal of the season: David McAllister for Sheffield United against Shrewsbury Town (18 August 2012)
Fastest goal of the season: 56 seconds, A-Jay Leitch-Smith for Crewe Alexandra against Scunthorpe United (21 August 2012)
Latest goal of the season: 95 minutes and 26 seconds, Paddy Madden for Carlisle United against Portsmouth (25 August 2012)
Largest winning margin: 5 goals
Preston North End 5–0 Hartlepool United (18 September 2012)
Hartlepool United 0–5 Coventry City (17 November 2012)
Swindon Town 5–0 Tranmere Rovers (21 December 2012)
Swindon Town 5–0 Portsmouth (1 January 2013)
Highest scoring game: 8 goals
Sheffield United 5–3 Bournemouth (1 September 2012)
Most goals scored in a match by a single team: 5 goals
Brentford 5–1 Crewe Alexandra (25 August 2012)
Sheffield United 5–3 Bournemouth (1 September 2012) 
Preston North End 5–0 Hartlepool United (18 September 2012)
Crawley Town 2–5 Tranmere Rovers (22 September 2012)
Hartlepool United 0–5 Coventry City (17 November 2012)
Milton Keynes Dons 5–1 Colchester United (24 November 2012)
Coventry City 5–1 Walsall (8 December 2012)
Swindon Town 5–0 Portsmouth (1 January 2013)
Colchester United 1–5 Tranmere Rovers (23 February 2013)
Most goals scored in a match by a losing team: 3 goals
Sheffield United 5–3 Bournemouth (1 September 2012)

Clean sheets
Most clean sheets: 21
Sheffield United
Fewest clean sheets: 5
Scunthorpe United

Discipline
Most yellow cards (club): 92
Oldham Athletic
Most yellow cards (player): 12
Harry Arter (AFC Bournemouth)
Most red cards (club): 7
Notts County
Most red cards (player): 3
Antony Kay (Milton Keynes Dons)

Awards

Monthly awards

Other awards

References

External links 
 

 
EFL League One seasons
2012–13 Football League
3
Eng